Reza Baqir is a Pakistani economist who served as the 20th Governor of the State Bank of Pakistan, from 4 May 2019 to 4 May 2022.

Early life and education
Reza Baqir was born to a Punjabi family in Vehari. His father Chaudhary Sharif Baqir was a very well known Barrister of Law and joined the PPP in 1988 and ran for the seat of National Assembly. Baqir received his early education from Aitchison College, Lahore.

He graduated from Harvard University magna cum laudeAB economics), and later obtained a PhD in economics at the University of California, Berkeley.

Career
Before his political career, Dr. Baqir held numerous positions in the International Monetary Fund (IMF). These included being the Mission Chief for Romania and Bulgaria. He was also the IMF's Senior Resident Representative.

In 2019, President Arif Alvi appointed Baqir governor of the State Bank of Pakistan for a period of three years. The appointment took place a day after his predecessor Tariq Bajwa was unexpectedly removed from his post.

Other activities
 International Monetary Fund (IMF), Ex-Officio Alternate Member of the Board of Governors (since 2019)

References

Living people
Governors of the State Bank of Pakistan
Pakistani economists
International Monetary Fund people
Pakistani expatriates in Egypt
Punjabi people
Year of birth missing (living people)
UC Berkeley College of Letters and Science alumni
Harvard College alumni
Aitchison College alumni